372nd or 372d may refer to:

372d Bombardment Squadron, inactive United States Air Force unit
372d Fighter Group or 144th Fighter Wing, unit of the California Air National Guard, stationed at Fresno Air National Guard Base, California
372d Fighter Squadron or 352d Tactical Fighter Squadron, inactive United States Air Force fighter squadron
372nd Engineer Brigade (United States), combat engineer brigade of the United States Army based in Fort Snelling, Minnesota
372nd Infantry Regiment (United States), an African American regiment, nominally part of the 93rd Infantry Division (Colored), served with the French Army in World War I
372nd Military Police Company (United States), law enforcement unit within the U.S. Army Reserve
372nd Rifle Division, division of the Red Army during the Second World War

See also
372 (number)
372, the year 372 (CCCLXXII) of the Julian calendar
372 BC